Justin Ling is a Canadian journalist and the author of the 2020 book Missing from the Village.

Career 
Ling is a Montreal-based freelance journalist who writes about security, privacy, politics, foreign policy, law, and defence. He is the author of the 2020 non-fiction book Missing from the Village, which won the 2021The Brass Knuckles Award for Best Nonfiction Crime Book (the Arthur Ellis Award) and was long listed for the Toronto Book Awards in 2021. Ling won an Amnesty International Canada media award for hosting season two of the Canadian Broadcasting Corporation podcast The Village.

References

External links 

 Official website

Living people
Canadian investigative journalists
Journalists from Montreal
Canadian podcasters
21st-century Canadian writers
Writers from Montreal
Canadian crime writers
Year of birth missing (living people)